Robert Boliver DePugh (April 15, 1923 – June 30, 2009) was an American anti-communist activist who founded the Minutemen  militant anti-Communist organization in 1961.

Life and career
DePugh was born in Independence, Missouri, where his father served as deputy sheriff. He enlisted in the United States Army during World War II, but he was dismissed for nervousness and depression. He attended Kansas State University for a few months before dropping out. DePugh founded a veterinary drug firm in 1953 that folded in 1956. He enrolled at Washburn University briefly, then started BioLab, another veterinary drug firm, in Norborne, Missouri, which was more successful. In addition to veterinary products, the company produces a malt-flavored ultra-compact storage food for humans called Minuteman Survival Tabs. Some 45 years later, this product is still used in survivalist circles. He became a member of the John Birch Society, and according to a biography he was influenced by the House Un-American Activities Committee.

DePugh published a 10-page pamphlet on guerilla warfare via the Minutemen in 1961. The Minutemen's newsletter was called On Target.  He was a founder of the Patriotic Party in 1966.

In 1966, DePugh was arrested on federal weapons charges, which were later dismissed. Their offices were bombed in 1967, and DePugh resigned from the Minutemen in 1967. In February 1968, he was indicted by a federal grand jury in Seattle, Washington for conspiracy to commit bank robbery. Also in 1968, he was arrested for violation of federal firearms laws. He skipped bail and went underground for over a year until he was caught in 1969 in Truth or Consequences, New Mexico. He was convicted in 1970 and released from prison in May 1973. DePugh later wrote an anti-communist quasi-survivalist manual, Can You Survive?, and was associated briefly with Liberty Lobby.

In the 1980s, DePugh became involved in the Identity Christianity movement. In the early 1990s he was tried but acquitted on a morals and pornography charge with an underage girl and on three counts of federal firearms violations. DePugh eventually grew disgusted with all politics and retired from activism.

He died on June 30, 2009, at his home in Richmond, Missouri.

Selected publications

Blueprint for Victory, Robert DePugh. 1966.
Can You Survive? Robert DePugh. Published by Desert Publications, El Dorado, AZ, 1973. 214 pages. 
Traitors Beware: A History Of Robert Depugh's Minutemen, by Eric Beckemeier. 2008. .

References

External links
"Robert DePugh and The Minutemen" via the Nizkor Project
FBI files on the Minutemen and DePugh, obtained under the FOIA and hosted at the Internet Archive:
Part 1
Part 2
Part 3

1923 births
2009 deaths
American anti-communists
People from Independence, Missouri
American bank robbers
Christian Identity
John Birch Society members
People from Richmond, Missouri
United States Army personnel of World War II